Thermopsin is an enzyme. This enzyme catalyses the following chemical reaction

 Similar in specificity to pepsin A preferring bulky hydrophobic amino acids in P1 and P1'

This enzyme is isolated from the thermophilic archeaon Sulfolobus acidocaldarius.

References

External links 
 

EC 3.4.23